Carsten Koch may refer to:
 Carsten Koch (musician) (born 1975), German organist, choral conductor and academic
 Carsten Koch (politician) (born 1945), Danish economist and former Social Democratic politician and minister